Great British Railway Journeys is a 2010-2021 BBC documentary series presented by Michael Portillo, a former Conservative MP and Cabinet Minister who was instrumental in saving the Settle to Carlisle line from closure in 1989. The documentary was first broadcast in 2010 on BBC Two and has returned annually for a total of 13 series.

The series features Portillo travelling around the railway networks of Great Britain, Ireland and the Isle of Man, referring to Bradshaw's Guide and comparing how the various destinations have changed since; initially, he used an 1840s copy, but in later series, he used other editions.

Portillo has presented 8 other series with a similar format: Great Continental Railway Journeys (7 series; 2012–2020), Great American Railroad Journeys (4 series; 2016–2020), Great Indian Railway Journeys (2018),  Great Alaskan Railroad Journeys and Great Canadian Railway Journeys (broadcast consecutively in January 2019), Great Australian Railway Journeys (2019), Great Asian Railway Journeys (2020) and Great Coastal Railway Journeys (2022).

Synopsis 
Victorian guidebooks written by George Bradshaw under the title Bradshaw's Guide were the first comprehensive timetable and travel guides to the railway system in Great Britain, which at the time although it had grown to be extensive, still consisted of several fragmented and competing railway companies and lines, each publishing their timetables.

Classified by the BBC in both the travel and history genres, the series features Portillo using the guide to plan his journeys, in the process visiting points of interest picked out in the guide and comparing its content with the modern world, both the physical and cultural ones.

Format 
Each series features Portillo travelling on a different route each week, with each daily episode being one short leg of the journey. The weekly journey is chosen to fit with a theme, either geographic, such as coast to coast, or historic. Filmed entirely on location, the series features a mix of Portillo delivering dialogue to the camera, as well as performing ad-hoc interviews with members of the public or fellow travellers, in addition to pre-arranged interviews.

Broadcast 
All episodes were originally broadcast on consecutive weekdays on BBC Two, in the 6:30 pm time slot. Some series were simulcast on BBC HD before the channel's demise. Repeats have been broadcast on BBC Four and BBC One, as well as the original channel of BBC Two. Edited versions of the episodes, reduced to about 23 minutes (excluding commercials), have been shown on the television channel Yesterday.

Episodes

Series 1 (2010)

Liverpool to Scarborough
The first journey takes Portillo from coast to coast, from Liverpool to Scarborough, beginning on the world's first passenger railway line.

Preston to Kirkcaldy
Portillo's second journey, from Preston to Scotland, is on one of the first railways to cross the border.

Swindon to Penzance
The third journey takes Portillo along the Great Western Railway from Swindon to Penzance, nicknamed 'the holiday line'.

Buxton to London
On this journey, Portillo travels from Buxton along one of the first railway routes south to the capital, London.

Series 2 (2011)

Brighton to Cromer
The first journey takes Portillo coast-to-coast from Brighton to Cromer

Ledbury to Holyhead
On this journey, Portillo follows the route of the Irish mail from Ledbury to Holyhead.

Newcastle to Melton Mowbray
This journey follows some of the earliest railways in the country from Newcastle to Melton Mowbray.

London Bridge to Hastings
This journey starts at London Bridge and goes through Kent and along its scenic coast to Hastings.

Ayr to Skye
On this journey, Portillo journeys up the west coast of Scotland from Ayr to Skye.

Series 3 (2012)
The third series featured four journeys in Great Britain, and a fifth journey which consisted of three legs in the Republic of Ireland and two in Northern Ireland: for this latter journey, the programme was re-titled as Great British Railway Journeys Goes To Ireland.

Great Yarmouth to Embankment
In these episodes, Portillo travels along the route of the Great Eastern Line, which goes from the east coast of England to the centre of the country's financial capital, London.

Windsor to Portland
Following in the footsteps of Queen Victoria, Portillo uses the railways she often rode from Windsor Castle to her country getaway on the Isle of Wight. His journey then continues west to Portland.

Oxford to Milford Haven
On this journey, Portillo travels west, from Oxford in the heart of England, through the Malvern Hills and into Wales, taking in the unique Victorian heritage of the South Wales coastline.

Berwick-Upon-Tweed to Snaefell
On this journey, Portillo takes in some of northern England's most dramatic scenery, from Berwick-upon-Tweed across the Pennines to the Lake District before completing the journey on the Isle of Man.

Goes to Ireland: Bray to Derry
On this journey, Portillo crosses the Irish Sea to discover the rich railway history of both the Republic of Ireland and Northern Ireland, following the unfurling 19th-century expansion of the tracks from Dublin to Derry.

Series 4 (2013)
The fourth series followed the same format as the third, with four journeys in Great Britain and the last in Ireland, the latter using the same title card as in series 3.

High Wycombe to Aberystwyth

Portillo follows the tracks that fuelled the industrial revolution, from the Chilterns to west Wales.

Portsmouth to Grimsby
The second journey sees Portillo go from port to port: from Portsmouth on the south coast to Grimsby on the east coast.

Stirling to John o' Groats
On this journey, Portillo enjoys the stunning scenery of rural and coastal Scotland, travelling from Stirling, through the industrial east coast and dramatic Highland landscapes, to the beauty of the western lochs, finally ending his journey in John o' Groats.

London Paddington to Newton Abbot
The fourth part of the series sees Portillo follow in the footsteps of the master engineer of the Great Western Railway, Isambard Kingdom Brunel, beginning at the line's London gateway, Paddington station, and ending in Newton Abbot, Devon – the scene of one of Brunel's heroic failures.

Goes to Ireland: Killarney to Galway
All this week, Portillo visits the Republic of Ireland, travelling from the rugged beauty of County Kerry, across the rural Irish Midlands, to end in the city of Galway on the Atlantic coast.

Series 5 (2014)

Manchester to Chesterfield

London Euston to Leeds

Southampton to Wolverhampton

Norwich to Chichester

Series 6 (2015)

Ayr to Edinburgh

Amersham to London Bridge

Derby to Lindisfarne

Pembroke Dock to Cambridge

Series 7 (2016)

Carlisle to Alton

Dover to Porthcurno

Birmingham to Dartmoor

Ashford to Henley-on-Thames

Series 8 (2017)

Series 9 (2018)

Series 10 (2019)

Series 11 (2020)

Series 12 (2021)

Series 13 (2021)

Books
Great British Railway Journeys, written by Charlie Bunce with a foreword by Michael Portillo, was published by Collins in January 2011.

Great Victorian Railway Journeys, written by Karen Farrington with a foreword by Michael Portillo, was published by Collins in January 2012.

The Complete Great British Railway Journeys, an amalgam of the above two books, was published by Collins in January 2015.

See also
 Great Railway Journeys

Notes

References

External links

 Series 1 and 2 at Michael Portillo's website

2010 British television series debuts
2021 British television series endings
2010s British documentary television series
2010s British travel television series
2020s British documentary television series
2020s British travel television series
BBC television documentaries
BBC travel television series
Documentary television series about railway transport
Rail transport in Great Britain
Television series by Fremantle (company)
Television shows set in England
Television shows set in London
Television shows set in Northern Ireland
Television shows set in Scotland
Television shows set in Wales